Pliskowola  is a village in the administrative district of Gmina Osiek, within Staszów County, Świętokrzyskie Voivodeship, in south-central Poland.

The village has a population of  1,034.

Demography 
According to the 2002 Poland census, there were 1,087 people residing in Pliskowola village, of whom 51% were male and 49% were female. In the village, the population was spread out, with 26.2% under the age of 18, 39% from 18 to 44, 18% from 45 to 64, and 16.8% who were 65 years of age or older.
 Figure 1. Population pyramid of village in 2002 – by age group and sex

Former parts of village – physiographic objects 
In the years 1970 of last age, sorted and prepared out list part of names of localities for Pliskowola, what you can see in table 3.

References

Pliskowola